The Crooked River, officially designated as a creek, is an open mature wave dominated barrier estuary located in the Illawarra region of New South Wales, Australia.

Location and features
Crooked River rises to the southeast of Princess Highway and the South Coast railway line, west southwest of Currys Mountain and southwest of Gerringong. The creek flows generally east southeast and south for about  reaching its mouth at Gerroa, where the creek borders Seven Mile Beach National Park and flows into the Tasman Sea of the South Pacific Ocean.

See also

 
 List of rivers of New South Wales (A–K)
 Rivers of New South Wales

References

External links
 
 

Rivers of New South Wales
Geography of Wollongong
Estuaries of New South Wales
Municipality of Kiama